Vice Admiral Georgios Giakoumakis (born 29 June 1959) is a Greek naval officer, and a former Chief of the Hellenic Navy General Staff.

He joined the Navy in 1977 and qualified as a communications officer. He commanded the frigate Kanaris and commanded the 1st Frigate Division.

He served as Deputy Commander in Chief of the Fleet, Deputy Commander of the Hellenic National Defence College and Commander of the Naval Training Command. He was then promoted to vice admiral and appointed Chief of the Fleet Command.

In 2015 he was appointed Chief of the Navy General Staff. Along with the chiefs of staff of the Army and the Air Force, he was dismissed by decision of the KYSEA on 16 January 2017 and replaced by Vice Admiral Nikolaos Tsounis, until then commander of the National Defence College.

Education
He obtained a Master of Science degree in Electrical Engineering from the Naval Postgraduate School.

References

1959 births
Chiefs of the Hellenic Navy General Staff
Hellenic Navy admirals
Living people
Military personnel from Chania